Sikkim tea is a variety of tea grown in the state of Sikkim, India. Though Sikkim tea is not as widespread in use as the neighboring Darjeeling tea, it has recently gained more recognition from the increasing demand for organic products. The tea is mostly sold under the marketing name 'Temi tea'. After Darjeeling tea became the first Indian product to receive a GI tag, Sikkim's Temi tea has been waiting to receive the same.

History 
Tea farming in Sikkim is primarily dominated by the Temi Tea Garden (owned by the Sikkim state government) and various other small tea growers. It started with the establishment of the Temi garden by the last king of Sikkim, Palden Thondup Namgyal, in an attempt to provide employment to a large number of Tibetan refugees living in the region.

Tea characteristics 
The first flush of Sikkim tea is harvested during springtime and has a unique taste and aroma. The tea is golden in color and has a light floral finish. It has a slightly sweet ta Sikkim tea has a toasty and strong flavour. The third flush (also called Monsoon Flush) is full-bodied and has a mellow taste. The final flush (or Autumn Flush) of the Sikkim tea has a well-rounded taste and the slight hint of warm spices.

Production and sale 
The temperate weather and altitude of the state are entirely suitable for tea cultivation and the tea is known for its distinct flavour and aroma. Sikkim produces two varieties of tea, one is the China variety and another is clone variety. Clone variety is a recent phenomenon and in the early phase was used to produce China variety only. Sikkim, with its only garden and few other small growers, produces an estimated 0.5 million kg (mkg) of tea annually. Black Tea is the usual farm produce, while a delicate white tea, which is manufactured from the buds and unfurled new leaves is also grown to order. A green tea, known for its flowery flavour; and the Oolong tea are also produced.

About 75 per cent of tea produced in Sikkim is sold via the Kolkata auction centre while the remaining is packaged for local sale. The tea is popular in the international market due to being completely organic. Major importers are Germany, United States, France, Canada, and Japan. The organic status of tea produced in the state has been certified by the Institute for Market Ecology (IMO), a member group of IMO Switzerland.

Tea estates 

 Bermiok is a boutique tea garden was established in the year 2002 by Mr. Tashi Densapa. This private estate is spread over 15 acres and stands at an elevation of 2500 ft to 3200 ft in the highlands of Sikkim. It is one of the youngest gardens in tea history and is completely organic. Due to the garden being young, the liquors from here are more floral and woody with a fresh aroma. Most of the garden is planted with Chinary bushes with patches of TV1 and TV2 clonal bushes. Currently, the estate is being managed by Mr. Nikhil Pradhan and his partner Mrs. Dolka Densapa. The estate produces around 1200 kg of tea in a year.

Temi Tea Garden, founded in 1969, is the oldest and the only government run estate in the state. The estate has a plantation area of 440 acres, originating from Tendong Hill, it is a producer of certified and characteristic organic tea.
The Temi Tea garden is one such spectacle. The 100% organic tea garden was certified and recognized by the IMO control board of India in the year 2017.

Medicinal uses 
Significant inhibitory activity, caused by hot water extract of black tea of Sikkim variety, has been observed against carrageenin, histamine, serotonin, and prostaglandin-induced pedal inflammation. The extract also inhibited exudative inflammation, cotton pellet-induced granuloma formation and adjuvant-induced polyarthritis. The extract has also shown significant inhibition against glucose oxidase-mediated inflammation. The observations have established the efficacy of this particular variety of black tea in the chronic phase of inflammation.

References

External links 

 
 

Black tea
Green tea
Oolong tea
Indian tea
Geographical indications in Sikkim
Culture of Sikkim
Tea estates in India